Robert Schumann’s “Davidsbündlertänze” is one of the last major works made by New York City Ballet's founding choreographer and balletmaster-in-chief, George Balanchine. It is set to Robert Schumann's Davidsbündlertänze (Dances of the League of David), Op. 6 (1837). The idea for setting this piano work very likely came from a work created by Robert Joffrey for his own Joffrey Ballet Company, the premier of which took place at the City Center Theater in the late 1970s. Joffrey, in turn, received his inspiration from Jonathan Watts, a protege of Joffrey's and director of the Joffrey apprentice company, who, at the suggestion of pianist Neil Stannard, created a ballet titled Evening Dialogues to this same score. This initial version of the Schumann cycle was featured on tour with the Joffrey second company in the mid 1970a.

The premiere took place on June 19, 1980, at the New York State Theater, Lincoln Center. A series of dances for four couples, the ballet draws on the life of Schumann, in particular his reunion with Clara Wieck after a 16-month estrangement in the year of its composition.

Original cast
 Karin von Aroldingen
 Suzanne Farrell
 Kay Mazzo
 Heather Watts
 Adam Lüders
 Jacques d'Amboise
 Ib Andersen
 Peter Martins

See also
 List of historical ballet characters

Footnotes

Reviews 
NY Times by Jack Anderson, November 21, 1980

External links 
Robert Schumann’s “Davidsbündlertänze” on the Balanchine Trust website

Ballets by George Balanchine
1980 ballet premieres
New York City Ballet repertory
Davidsbundlertanze, Robert Schumann's